Irma Pezzia Haubold (November 20, 1908 – April 4, 1996) was an American artistic gymnast. She competed at the 1936 Summer Olympics and placed fifth with the team. She was married to a fellow Olympic gymnast Frank Haubold. They were the first married couple of compete in the same Olympics.

References

1908 births
1996 deaths
Gymnasts at the 1936 Summer Olympics
Olympic gymnasts of the United States
American female artistic gymnasts
Sportspeople from Union City, New Jersey
20th-century American women
20th-century American people
People from Union City, New Jersey